Edisson Lachezarov Jordanov (born 8 June 1993) is a professional footballer who plays as a midfielder for Belgian First Division A club Westerlo. Born in Germany, he plays for the Bulgaria national team.

Early life
Jordanov was born in Rostock to a Bulgarian father who emigrated to Germany in 1988, Lachezar Jordanov, and a German mother, Karina.

Club career

Youth
He started playing football at SV Holdenstedt, a local club from Uelzen, Lower Saxony. Later he moved to Eintracht Schwerin and in 2006 he relocated to the city of his birth to join the youth ranks of Hansa Rostock.

Hansa Rostock
In the first half of the 2011–12 season, Jordanov scored seven goals in 13 appearances for the under-19s. He made his Hansa first team debut in a 2–1 away loss against VfL Bochum on 5 February 2012.

Borussia Dortmund
On 31 May 2013, Jordanov signed with Borussia Dortmund II for two years. In January 2014, Jordanov was called up to the first team for training camp in San Pedro del Pinatar, Spain. On 12 January, he made his debut in a friendly against Standard Liège, coming on as a 70th-minute substitute for Kevin Großkreutz. Two days later he scored a goal in friendly match against VfL Bochum. In the following second half of the 2013–14 Bundesliga though, he did not manage to become a part of the first team and was never called up for the squad in an official match.

Virton
Ahead of the 2019–20 season, Jordanov joined Belgian club Virton.

Westerlo
On 7 July 2021, Jordanov signed a two-year contract with Westerlo.

International career
Jordanov has been capped for Germany U15, Germany U16 and Germany U19.

In 2012, he declined an invitation to play for Bulgaria U-21, but in the next year he became part of the team. He made his debut for Bulgaria U21 in September 2013.

Jordanov received his first call-up for the senior Bulgaria team in October 2021 for the matches against Ukraine and Switzerland on 11 and 15 November. He earned his first cap against the former, appearing as a starter, but was substituted by Ivan Turitsov early during the first half due to sustaining an injury.

Career statistics

Club

Honours 
Westerlo

 Belgian First Division B: 2021–22

References

1993 births
Living people
Sportspeople from Rostock
Bulgarian footballers
Bulgaria international footballers
Bulgaria youth international footballers
German footballers
Germany youth international footballers
German people of Bulgarian descent
Association football midfielders
2. Bundesliga players
3. Liga players
FC Hansa Rostock players
Borussia Dortmund II players
Borussia Dortmund players
Stuttgarter Kickers players
SC Preußen Münster players
F91 Dudelange players
R.E. Virton players
Royale Union Saint-Gilloise players
K.V.C. Westerlo players
Challenger Pro League players
Expatriate footballers in Belgium
Bulgarian expatriate sportspeople in Belgium